Wilson Alcorro (born March 11, 1973) is a Colombian former professional boxer who competed from 1994 to 2011. He held the IBF Latino title in 1996.

Professional career

IBF Latino Championship
In May 1996, Wilson knocked out undefeated Jud Franky Granada to win the IBF Latino title.

Soto vs. Alcorro
On May 28, 2004 Alcorro lost by T.K.O. to WBC Featherweight champion Humberto Soto over twelve rounds.

References

External links

1974 births
Living people
Colombian male boxers
Light-welterweight boxers
Southpaw boxers
People from Montería
20th-century Colombian people